The women's Softball at the 2010 South American Games in Medellín was held from March 21 to March 25. All games were played at Oswaldo Osorio Rodríguez stadium. After the Page playoff system, Venezuela defeated Colombia 7-1 to win the tournament undefeated.

Medal summary

Medal table

Results

First round

Semifinals

Bronze Medal match

Gold Medal match

References

2010 South American Games
South American Games
South American Games
2010 South American Games
Softball in Colombia